Rhodanthe anthemoides, commonly known as chamomile sunray, is a perennial species of flowering plant in the family Asteraceae. It is endemic to Australia. Plants have multiple stems rising from the base which reach up to 40 cm high and spread to 60 cm wide. The leaves are about 10 mm long and 0.5 to 2 mm in width.

A central cluster of pale yellow flowers is surrounded by petal-like white, papery bracts. These appear between September and February in the species' native range. These are followed by small dry achenes that have silky hairs.

The species occurs in Queensland, New South Wales, Victoria and Tasmania. Although a widespread species on the mainland, in Tasmania it is listed as "rare" under the TSP Act. It is found in mountainous regions growing in sandy soil.

Cultivation
The species is commonly cultivated, preferring a well drained, lightly shaded situation. Cutting back after flowering prevents plants from becoming straggly. Plants are well suited to being grown in containers.

Propagation is from seed or cuttings, named cultivars requiring the latter method to be true to type.

Cultivars include:

'Annan Star'
'Chamomile Cascade'
'Milky Way'
'Paper Baby' - a form with red buds
'Paper Cascade' - a form with red buds
'Paper Moon' ('Rhomoon')
'Paper Star' - compact form
'Paper Trail' ('Rhotrail')
'Southern stars'
'Sunray Snow'

References

anthemoides
Flora of New South Wales
Flora of Queensland
Flora of Tasmania
Flora of Victoria (Australia)
Taxa named by Paul G. Wilson